Renzo Colzi (8 November 1937 – 26 January 2014) was a French cyclist. He competed in the time trial event at the 1956 Summer Olympics.

References

External links
 

1937 births
2014 deaths
French male cyclists
Olympic cyclists of France
Cyclists at the 1956 Summer Olympics
Cyclists from Paris